Tancyuyut Vsi! (Танцюють всі! in its original Ukrainian orthography and translated in English as Everybody Dance!) is a television program which airs on the Ukrainian channel STB and is based on the format of the American series So You Think You Can Dance.  The series, hosted by Lily Rebryk and Dmitry Tankovych, first premiered in September 2008. The winner of the competition receives between ₴150,000 and ₴250,000 and occasionally further prizes.

Format

The show shared many style and format elements with other entries in the So You Think You Can Dance franchise, including the general premise of challenging dancers from a wide variety of stylistic backgrounds to tackle a variety of dance genres.  A season began with open auditions, held throughout the Ukraine, where hopeful contestants performed before a judge's panel of dance experts.  From this initial talent pool, 100 dancers (later this number grew up to 200) were selected to attend extensive workshops and testing over the course of a week in Yalta or, from 5th season, some place near Kyiv (similar to the "Vegas Week" and "Boot Camp" portions of other So You Think You Can Dance shows).  From these 100 dancers, 20 (22 in seasons 5-8 and 40 in season 9) were ultimately chosen to take part in the live performance shows.  In season 5, two additional dancers were chosen by viewer voting. Over successive weeks, these finalists (paired in male-female couples) danced duets, solos, and group routines in a variety of styles in order to stay in the competition, with one male and one female dancer being eliminated each week through a combination of at-home-viewer voting and judge panel decisions until a Top 4 finale, when the champion was crowned. On sixth week of season 5 the rules were changed slightly, allowing to eliminate dancers regardless of their sex. In season 6, the rules were changed so that the "top 20" had to contest in the Trials and only the "top 10" (which actually consisted of 12 dancers in seasons 6-7 and 8 dancers in season 8) got to dance in the live performance shows.

Seasons overview

Season One
Top 20:Victoria Martynova, Dennis Hrystyuk, Lydia Shramko, Mariam  Turkmenbayeva, Mikhail Smagin, Sergei Rudenko, Maxim Pekniy, Alexander Ostanin, Dennis Mirhoyazov, Daria Malikova, Vadim Lyashchenko, Alexander Leshchenko, Natalie Krotova, Eugene Cote, Lyubov Zarembo, Yana Dudnik, Olga Goldys, Maria Bezyakina, Nicholay Boychenko, Oleg Zhezhel.

Season Two
Top 20: Victoria Skytska, Katerina Buhtyyarova, Ilona Gvozdyova, Yaroclava Slonova, Artem (Tyoma) Volosov, Andriy (Andres) Hlushyk, Artem Gordeev, Roman Dmytryk, Valentina Marinina, Alyona Perepelytsa, Igor Horbonos, Andriy Gutsal, Sergiy Zmiyok, Alina Nizyayeva, Vitaliy Zagoruyko, Eugene Karjakin, Katerina (Katya) Karjakina, Natalia Lihaj, Inna Mazurenko, Oleg Patrakov.

Season Three
Top 20: Anna Teslya, Fedir Hashalov, Eugenia (Genya) Khramova, Evgeny Panchenko, Tisato Ishikawa, Maxim Orobets, Julia Sahnevych, Eugene Kulakovskiy, Olena Pul, Konstantin (Kostya) Koval, Daria Olkhovska, Makar Kilivnik, Martha Zhyr, Anton (Tony) Kyba, Adriana Kostetska, Nikita Eryomin, Angela Karasyova, Anton Davidenko, Eugenia Dekhtyarenko, Alexander Gerashchenko

Season Four
Top 20: Sergey Poyarkov, Rodion Farhshatov, Maria Kozlova, Maxim Bochahin, Julia Kudynova, Lydia Soklakova, Tisato Ishikawa, Ilya Vermenych, Alexander (Sasha) Varenko, Vitaly Savchenko, Anastasia Rychkova, Galina (Galya) Pyeha, Anastasia (Nastya) Sergeeva, Kateryna (Katya) Bilyavska, Anatoly (Tolik) Sachivko, Elena Ignatieva, Vasil Kozar, Zoya Sahanenko, Vitaly (Vitalik) Galkin, Ivan Drozdov.

Season 1-4 Battle ("Повернення героїв")

Season Five
Top 22: Alisa Zaitseva, Anna Edinak, Anton Rybalchenko, Vlad Korsunenko, Ekaterina (Katya) Gubskaya, Nikita Vasilenko, Polina Bokova, Angelica Nikolayeva, Oleksiy (Lyosha) Kucherenko, Artem Shoshin, Alexander (Sasha) Volkov, Danila Sitnikov, Dima Chopenko, Ildar Tagirov, Sveta Cambur, Sonia Gevorkyan, Sophya Chaudhary, Tanya Danilevskaya, Olga Shapovalova, Julian Tsurcanu, Eugene Rogozenko, Jeanna Terentyeva.

Season Six
Top 22: Alysa Dotsenko, Elena Holovan, Ilya Kiselnikov, Alexander Semenov, Irina Kreydina, Oleg Klevakin, Andrei Kalugin, Valeria Fefilova, Anastasiia Kolisnichenko, Anton Panufnik, Elizaveta Ospischeva, Julia Lad, Olga Trehub, Anastasia Yavorskaya, Eghert Soren Nõmm, Dmitry Shchebet, Dmitry Oleynikov, Ulyana Holoviy, Sergei Avakian, Nikita Kravchenko, Yana Zaets, Vladimir Rakov.

Season Seven
Top 22: Anna Levchenko, Vitaliy Novikov, Ekatherina Klishina (3), Mishel Tinjo, Alyona Anufrieva, Nazar Grabar, Ekatherina Barvinskaya, Boris Shipulin, Elena Belokon, Oleg Tatarinov, Marta Brizhan, Sergei Drugov, Yuliana Dyakiv, Sergei Osirnyi, Natalya Pechernaya, Alexander Alshanov, Nadezhda Appolonova, Dmitry Maslennikov (2), Anna Nikolenko-Bashtovaya (4), Ilya Padzina, Yana Abraimova, Daniel Sibilli (winner).

Season Eight

Top 22: Tatyana Ogurtsova, Dmitry Pozovny, Stanislav Turmovich, Jane Sytenko, Kristina Zayats, Vladimir Galenko, Marina Mazepa, Timofey Pendik, Darya Koval, Roman Nevinchanyi, Stephaniya Mfunu, Ilya Chizhik, Tatyana Vytsup, Ildar Gainutdinov, Bahtiyar Ibragimov, Alexandra Borodina, Anna Korostelyova, Viktor Tomashek, Vladislav Hristyuha, Ilya Miroshnichenko, Elina Antonova.

Season Nine
Top 16: Bogdan Urkhov, Ayhan Shinzhin, Andrey Kirillin, Ilona Fedorko, Liuba Mironets, Vlad Kurochka, Alyona Kordoban, Vasil Dipchikov, Vlad Litvinenko, Nikita Mitrofanov, Eva Uvarova, Emily Moskalenko, Michelle Nocca, Mihai Ungureanu, Kai Lin, Ekatherina Firsova.

See also
Dance on television

References

External links
 

So You Think You Can Dance
2010s Ukrainian television series debuts
Dance competition television shows
2010s Ukrainian television series endings
STB (TV channel) original programming